Johan Geibert (born 27 September 1977) is a Swedish Bandy player who currently plays for Västerås SK as a midfielder. Johan was a youth product of Västerås SK and made his first team debut in the 1997/98 season.

External links
  johan geibert at bandysidan
  västerås sk

Swedish bandy players
Living people
1977 births
Västerås SK Bandy players
Place of birth missing (living people)
21st-century Swedish people